Aaron Heading (born 21 May 1987) is a clay-pigeon shooter, specialising in the Trap discipline. He represents England and Great Britain.

In 2010 Heading earned selection for the England shooting team for the 2010 Commonwealth Games in Delhi from 3–14 October 2010. He won Bronze when competing in the men's trap pairs, with partner David Kirk, and Gold in the singles event.

He has qualified to represent Great Britain at the 2020 Summer Olympics.

References

External links

1987 births
Living people
English male sport shooters
Sportspeople from King's Lynn
People from Spalding, Lincolnshire
Commonwealth Games gold medallists for England
Commonwealth Games bronze medallists for England
Commonwealth Games medallists in shooting
Trap and double trap shooters
Shooters at the 2010 Commonwealth Games
Shooters at the 2014 Commonwealth Games
Shooters at the 2018 Commonwealth Games
Shooters at the 2019 European Games
European Games medalists in shooting
European Games bronze medalists for Great Britain
Shooters at the 2020 Summer Olympics
Medallists at the 2010 Commonwealth Games
Medallists at the 2014 Commonwealth Games
Medallists at the 2018 Commonwealth Games